Apedilum is a genus of non-biting midges of the bloodworm family Chironomidae. The genus was previously considered a junior synonym of Paralauterborniella, but was restored as a separate genus by J. H. Epler (1988) for the species A. elachistus and A. subcinctum.

Species
A. elachistus Townes, 1945
A. griseistriatum (Edwards, 1931)
A. subcinctum Townes, 1945

References

Chironomidae